DBC News (Dhaka Bangla Channel) is a Bangladeshi Bengali-language satellite and cable news television channel, owned and operated by Dhaka Bangla Media & Communication Ltd. The Chairman of the channel is Iqbal Sobhan Chowdhury, former Media Adviser to Prime Minister Sheikh Hasina. The Managing Director is Sahidul Ahsan and CEO & Editor in Chief is Monjurul Islam.

History 
In 2013, the Bangladesh Telecommunication Regulatory Commission granted Iqbal Sobhan Chowdhury's Dhaka Bangla Media & Communication a license to broadcast "Dhaka-Bangla Television". It also received its frequency allocation in January 2015. The channel was launched as DBC News on 21 September 2016. Sahidul Ahsan was the founding managing director while Monjurul Islam was the founding news editor. The opening was attended by Commerce Minister Tofail Ahmed and Information Minister Hasanul Haq Inu. It started with the broadcast of the 10 am news. In December 2019, DBC News, along with three other Bangladeshi television channels, signed an agreement with UNICEF to air programming regarding children's issues.

Censorship and violence 
On 27 October 2017, a motorcade of former Prime Minister Khaleda Zia was attacked in Feni District. The news van of DBC and other news organizations were damaged in the attack. DBC News correspondent Partho Hasan was attacked by Shirhan Sharif Tomal, Bangladesh Jubo League leader and son of Land Minister Shamsur Rahman Sherif, on 29 November 2017. Bangladesh Police closed eight members of the Detective Branch of Barisal Metropolitan Police for torturing a cameraman of DBC in Barisal on 12 March 2018. The police team that attacked the journalist were led by sub-inspector Abul Bashar. According to the US State Department Human Rights Report for 2017 the government of Bangladesh forced DBC news to remove a news item tiled “Bangladesh’s Hasina Survives another Attempt on Her Life.” The news was sourced to a Burmese news portal.

Programming 
Rajkahon on DBC News is a primetime political talk show hosted by Sharmin Chowdhury, a television journalist. Choturnogo is a weekly show featuring individuals from the arts and entertainment field.

References 

Television channels and stations established in 2016
Television channels in Bangladesh
Mass media in Dhaka
2016 establishments in Bangladesh
24-hour television news channels in Bangladesh